Revista Bohemia (also referred to as Bohemia) is Cuba's oldest general consumer magazine. Founded in 1908 by Miguel Ángel Quevedo Pérez, it provides commentary on politics, analysis of history, as well as advice on fashion, when in 1927, Miguel Ángel Quevedo became the editor. It made claims of being the first to publish the work of Cuban artists in color. Marta Rojas was one of its journalists.

References

Bibliography

External links
Official website

Magazines published in Cuba
Magazines established in 1908